Pefloxacin is a quinolone antibiotic used to treat bacterial infections.  Pefloxacin has not been approved for use in the United States.

History

Pefloxacin was developed in 1979 and approved in France for human use in 1985.

Licensed uses
 
Uncomplicated gonococcal urethritis in males.
Bacterial infections in the gastrointestinal system.
Genitourinary tract infections.
Gonorrhoea. however this indication is no longer effective due to bacterial resistance.

Pefloxacin has been increasingly used as a veterinary medicine to treat microbial infections.

Mode of action

Pefloxacin is a broad-spectrum antibiotic that is active against both Gram-positive and Gram-negative bacteria.  It functions by inhibiting DNA gyrase, a type II topoisomerase, and topoisomerase IV, which is an enzyme necessary to separate, replicated DNA, thereby inhibiting cell division.

Adverse effects
Tendinitis and rupture, usually of the Achilles tendon, are class-effects of the fluoroquinolones, most frequently reported with pefloxacin.  The estimated risk of tendon damage during pefloxacin therapy has been estimated by the French authorities in 2000 to be 1 case per 23,130 treatment days as compared to ciprofloxacin where it has been estimated to be 1 case per 779,600.

References

External links
 How Stuff Works - Cipro
 Package insert information

1,4-di-hydro-7-(1-piperazinyl)-4-oxo-3-quinolinecarboxylic acids
Fluoroquinolone antibiotics
Piperazines